Fu Kwan is one of the 29 constituencies in the Sai Kung District.

The constituency returns one district councillor to the Sai Kung District Council, with an election every four years.

Fu Kwan constituency is loosely based on Beverly Garden, The Grandiose and The Wings in Tseung Kwan O with an estimated population of 18,975.

Councillors represented

Election results

2010s

References

Tseung Kwan O
Constituencies of Hong Kong
Constituencies of Sai Kung District Council
2003 establishments in Hong Kong
Constituencies established in 2003